"Only You" is a single by English band Portishead, released in 1998. It was later released in a promotional French language lyrics version.

The video to "Only You" was directed by Chris Cunningham, who has also worked with Aphex Twin, Björk, and Placebo. It involved Beth Gibbons floating in air, and a young boy. The people were shot in a tank of water and then digitally inserted into an alleyway of a street scene.

The band performed the song on American television variety show Saturday Night Live on January 17, 1998.

Track listing

 "Only You" (Edit)
 "Elysium" (Parlour Talk Remix)
 "Only You" (NYC)
 "Only You"

Personnel

 Beth Gibbons – vocals, production
 Adrian Utley – bass, guitar, Rhodes, production
 Geoff Barrow – drums, turntables, samples, programming, production 
 John Baggot – organ
 Dave McDonald – production

Charts

References

1998 singles
Music videos directed by Chris Cunningham
Portishead (band) songs
Songs written by Geoff Barrow
Songs written by Beth Gibbons
Songs written by Adrian Utley
Alternative hip hop songs